is a former Japanese football player.

Playing career
Kita was born in Takatsuki on April 25, 1978. After graduating from Kindai University High School, he joined the J1 League club Júbilo Iwata in 1997. Although he also played as defensive midfielder not only center back, he could not play many matches in the club which many Japan national team players played. In April 2000, he moved to JEF United Ichihara. He played as a left defender of three backs defense. In 2002, he moved to the J2 League club Cerezo Osaka based in his local area. He became a regular player as a right defender of a three-back defense in 2002 and the club was promoted to J1. However his opportunity to play decreased in 2003. In 2004, he moved to the newly promoted J1 League club, Albirex Niigata. He also played as a left side back, not only as a center back, over three seasons. After eight months, he joined the J2 club Thespa Kusatsu in September 2007. Although he played as a regular center back in 2008, his opportunity to play decreased in 2009. In 2010, he moved to the Japan Football League club Gainare Tottori. He played as a regular player and the club won the championship in 2010. Although the club was promoted to J2 in 2011, his opportunity to play decreased and he retired at the end of the 2011 season.

Club statistics

References

External links

1978 births
Living people
Association football people from Osaka Prefecture
People from Takatsuki, Osaka
Japanese footballers
J1 League players
J2 League players
Japan Football League players
Júbilo Iwata players
JEF United Chiba players
Cerezo Osaka players
Albirex Niigata players
Thespakusatsu Gunma players
Gainare Tottori players
Association football defenders